New Baptist Covenant is an association of Baptist organizations for social justice.

History

The New Baptist Covenant traces its roots to April 10, 2006 in Atlanta, when former U.S. President and prominent Baptist layman Jimmy Carter and Mercer University President Bill Underwood convened a gathering of 18 Baptist leaders, who produced A North American Baptist Covenant for social justice. 

In 2007, the organization was officially founded by Jimmy Carter and Bill Clinton.

In 2008, an event bringing together representatives of American moderate Baptist denominations was held in Atlanta to present the vision of the organization.

References and notes

External links
New Baptist Covenant website

Christian organizations established in 2006
Baptist organizations established in the 21st century